Manuel Antonio de Varona y Loredo (November 25, 1908 in Camagüey, Cuba – October 29, 1992 in Miami, Florida, United States) was a Cuban lawyer and politician.

Career 
Varona is 7th Prime Minister of Cuba in 1948–1950, and served as president of the Cuban Senate from 1950 to 1952. In 1960, Varona went into exile after denouncing Castro's communist regime. He was a member of the exile coalition Cuban Revolutionary Council (1961–1964). 

He had three children: Carlos de Varona Segura who participated in the April 17th Bay of Pigs Invasion, Emelina Ivette, and Ivonne de Varona Ruisanchez.

He wrote El drama de Cuba ante América (1960, Mexico City, Centro de Información Democrática de América).

He is buried at Flagler Memorial Park in Miami, Florida.

Work for the CIA
During Varona's exile in Miami, the CIA supported his operational planning for the Bay of Pigs Invasion. They provided pills laced with botulinum toxin to affect the assassination of Fidel Castro. The pills were never used, because Castro had stopped visiting the restaurant where an anti-Castro worker intended to use them.

A transcript declassified in 2021 of a 1975 Church Committee hearing detailed the covert CIA operation to assassinate Castro:
Mr. Breckinridge: Just before the first phase ended, Roselli, through Trafficante, was introduced to another Cuban exile leader in Miami by the name of Anthony Varona. Again, his name is a sensitive matter.

Varona was the leader of one of the groups that was being
supported by the CIA as part of the preparation for the Bay
of Pigs.

Varona was unhappy with his association, with the association
with the CIA. He felt he had not been given enough money.
Varona was approached by Roselli with Trafficante's introduction
to take on this mission

Roselli's story was that he represented some private client
who had interest in Cuba. The Roselli identity was apparent,
as was Trafficante's.

Varona said he knew someone who was in a restaurant that
Castro frequented and then the pills were transported again.

Mr. Schwartz. Could you state for the record who made the pills?

Mr. Breckinridge. The pills were made in what was then
the Technical Services Division of the CIA.

Mr. Schwartz. Had they ever made such pills before?

Mr. Breckinridge. Not that I know of.

Mr. Schwartz. Had they ever used Botulinum as a poison in
any way before?

Mr, Breckinridge. On one previous occasion Botulinum
had been considered for use on cigars that someone had hoped
to get to Castro, and eventually that never got off the ground.
This was a scheme that was never approved and never went forward.
I know of one instance in which it was considered.

Botulinum was made into pills and these pills were taken
again to Cuba. Castro stopped going to the restaurant where
this man was. The Bay of Pigs occurred and the operation
was called off.

References  

 Directorio Social de La Habana 1948, (P. Fernandez y Cia, S. en C.) 
 Libro de Oro de la Sociedad Habanera 1949, (Editorial Lex) 
 Libro de Oro de la Sociedad Habanera 1950, (Editorial Lex) 
 Registro Social de La Habana 1958, (Molina y Cia, S.A.) 
  (Spanish)

Presidents of the Senate of Cuba
Prime Ministers of Cuba
Exiles of the Cuban Revolution in the United States
1908 births
1992 deaths
1940s in Cuba
1950s in Cuba
20th-century Cuban lawyers
20th-century Cuban politicians